Below is an incomplete List of Diplomats from the United Kingdom to Hawaii dealing with diplomatic representation in the Kingdom of Hawaii and its successor states the Provisional Government of Hawaii and the Republic of Hawaii before annexation to the United States in 1898.

British ambassadors to Hawaii
Richard Charlton, from 1824 to 1843
Guillermo Miller, from 1844 to 1859
Robert Crichton Wyllie, 1844 to 1845, acting consul
Busvargus Toup Nicolas, 1859, acting consul
William Lowthian Green, acting consul
William Webb Follett Synge, from 1862 to 1866
James Hay Wodehouse (1824–1911), from 1866 to 1894
Theophilus Harris Davies, from 1872 to 1873, acting consul
Albert George Sidney Hawes, from 1894 to 1897
William Joseph Kenney (1859–), from 1897 to 1898

References

Hawaii
 
United Kingdom
Diplomats